The 2018 Louisville Cardinals football team represented the University of Louisville during the 2018 NCAA Division I FBS football season. The Cardinals competed in the Atlantic Division of the Atlantic Coast Conference. They played their home games at Cardinal Stadium (previously Papa John's Cardinal Stadium) in Louisville, Kentucky. They were led by head coach Bobby Petrino until he was fired on November 11 after starting the season 2–8. Lorenzo Ward was the interim head coach for the remainder of the season. They finished the season 2–10, 0–8 in ACC play to finish in last place in the Atlantic Division.

On December 4, Louisville hired Appalachian State head coach Scott Satterfield for the head coaching job.

Previous season

The Louisville Cardinals finished the 2017 season 8–5 overall, 4–4 in ACC play to finish in fourth place in the Atlantic Division. The Cardinals would be invited to the TaxSlayer Bowl, where they would eventually lose 27–31 to the Mississippi State Bulldogs. Following the season, star quarterback Lamar Jackson would come in third place in Heisman Trophy voting, before declaring on January 5, 2018, he would be entering the 2018 NFL Draft.

Offseason

Coaching changes
On January 13, 2018, the Cardinals announced the hiring of Ryan Beard as new safeties coach. On January 29, 2018, the Cardinals announced the hiring of Brian VanGorder as new defensive coordinator, replacing former DC Peter Sirmon. On February 2, 2018, the Cardinals announced the hiring of Grady Brown as defensive assistant and recruiting coordinator.

On November 11 Louisville fired Bobby Petrino.

Departures
Notable departures from the 2017 squad included:

2019 NFL Draft

Cardinals who were picked in the 2019 NFL Draft:

Recruits

The Cardinals signed a total of 23 recruits.

Preseason

Award watch lists
Listed in the order that they were released

ACC media poll
The ACC media poll was released on July 24, 2018.

Schedule
The Cardinals' 2018 schedule consisted of 7 home games and 5 away games, including the first game of the season being played in Orlando, Florida at Camping World Stadium, a neutral-site venue. The Cardinals first non-conference game was an away game, against Alabama of the Southeastern Conference (SEC), before hosting the remaining three non-conference games; against FCS opponent Indiana State from the Missouri Valley Football Conference (MVFC), Western Kentucky of Conference USA (C-USA) and against arch-rival Kentucky of the SEC.

Sources:

Game summaries

vs Alabama

Indiana State

Western Kentucky

at Virginia

Florida State

Georgia Tech

at Boston College

Wake Forest

at Clemson

at Syracuse

NC State

Kentucky

References

Louisville
Louisville Cardinals football seasons
Louisville Cardinals football